Monachino is a surname.  It can refer to:

 , human settlement in Italy
 , Italian biochemist
 Jim Monachino (b. 1929), former American football halfback
  (1911–1962), Italian-born US botanist
 , Italian statistics and data analysis teaching tutor at University of Trento
 Ted Monachino (b. 1966), US football coach